Emma Vilarasau Tomàs (born 6 April 1959 in Sant Cugat del Vallès, Catalonia, Spain) is a Spanish stage, cinema and television actress.

Biography 

She studied at the Institut del Teatre, in Barcelona. After having worked on many plays she became famous in Catalonia thanks to the character Eulàlia Montsolís whom she played in TV3 TV series Nissaga de poder. She has interpreted other TV series characters in series such as Majoria absoluta or Ventdelplà. She has worked on many movies for both television and cinema.

She is married to fellow actor Jordi Bosch with whom she has two sons: Jordi (born in 1991) and Marc (born in 1995).

Filmography

Stage 
Santa Joana dels Escorxadors, vers 1980
Mort, Dimoni i Carn, 1982
L'impromtu a Versalles, 1982
L'héroe, 1983
Al vostre gust,1983
Els Fills del Sol, 1984
La Flauta Màgica, 1984
Un dels Últims Vespres de Carnaval, 1985
La Ronda, 1986
El 30 d'abril, 1987
L'última Copa, 1987
Lorenzaccio, Lorenzaccio, 1987
La Bona Persona de Sezuan, 1988	
Les Noces de Fígaro, 1989
Combat entre Negre i Gossos, 1989
Els gegants de la Muntanya, 1990
Tàlem, 1990
Terra Baixa, 1990
Dansa d'Agost, 1991
La Infanticida, 1992
Roberto Zucco, 1993
El Barret dels Cascavells, 1994
Busco el Senyor Ferran, 1996
Paraules Encadenades, 1998
Lectura de poemes de Miquel Martí i Pol, 1998
El Criptograma,1999
Un Tranvia Anomenat Desig, 2000
L'habitació del nen, 2003
Paraules Contra la Guerra, 2003
Les tres germanes, 2005
Un matrimoni de Boston, 2005 i 2006
Carta d'una desconeguda, 2007

Television 
Quico el progre, 1993
Secrets de família, 1995
Nissaga de poder, 1996–98
Crims, 2000
Mirall trencat, 2002
Majoria absoluta, 2002–03
Ventdelplà, 2005–10

Cinema and TV films 
Ni tan siquiera tienes ojos azules, 1997 (Short)
Un caso para dos, 1996
Dues dones, 1998
Els sense nom, 1999
Utopia, 2001
L'illa de l'holandès, 2001
Germanes de sang, 2001
Gossos, 2002
Las voces de la noche, 2002
Para que no me olvides, 2005 (Nominated to the Goya Awards 2005 in the category of best actress and winner of the Sant Jordi Award for best Spanish actress)

External links 
  

1959 births
Living people
Stage actresses from Catalonia
Television actresses from Catalonia
Film actresses from Catalonia
Spanish film actresses
Spanish television actresses
Spanish stage actresses
Actresses from Barcelona
21st-century Spanish actresses
20th-century Spanish actresses